Khuwaphok  is rural village located in Sangurigadhi Rural Municipality ward no. 3 of Dhankuta District in the Koshi Zone of eastern Nepal.  At the time of the 1991 Nepal census it had a population of 2918 people living in 537 individual households.  

Khuwaphok has its boarder connected with neighbouring village; Budhimorang, Dandabazar, Bodhe and headquarter of Dhankuta. Maden danda also known as 'chowk' among the local people is the major market area of people living in Khuwaphok. Dal Bahadur Linkha was the person to open a shop in this remote area for the first time. He used to carry goods by himself and bring them to access of people at the beginning. But now this place is connected to several road ways and has easy access of vehicles. The number of shops and hotels are growing there. But still some problems arises at monsoon season.

Khuwaphok is major residence of Yakkha and Limbu people along with few Rai and Newar household. It is a village with astonishing natural beauty and people with immense hospitality. One can witness beautiful mountain range along with Mt. Kumbhakarna and Mt. Kanchanjunga. Khuwaphok carries probability of domestic tourism as it has suitable climate condition, astonishing scenic beauty. Sunsets and sunrises from this place is the scene one must witness for once in their lifetime. 

Also, Khuwaphok has historic importance as well. Marahang was the ruler of this place during kirant period. There are few evidences left about his ruling period. The tall pillar like stone is said to be the place to tie the ruler's elephant at that time. Marahang jungle is said to be the place where marahang used to go for hunting. There is a place having big pot-like stone which is known as 'Bhadalung'. 'Bhada' refers to pot and 'lung' refers to place in kiranti language. The pot makes metal sound when we hit it with something. It can be major attraction for tourists. It is still a mystery why the pot sounds like metal.

References

Populated places in Dhankuta District